Richard Alderson (born 27 January 1975) is an English former professional footballer who played as a winger.

Career
Born in Darlington, County Durham, Alderson started his career with Spennymoor United.

References

External links

1977 births
Living people
Footballers from Darlington
English footballers
Association football wingers
Spennymoor United F.C. players
York City F.C. players
Whitby Town F.C. players
Blyth Spartans A.F.C. players
Gateshead F.C. players
Durham City A.F.C. players
English Football League players
Brandon United F.C. players